Jacco Eltingh and Paul Haarhuis were the defending champions, but did not participate this year.

Byron Black and Jared Palmer won the title, defeating Tommy Ho and Brett Steven 6–4, 3–6, 6–3 in the final.

Seeds

Draw

Draw

External links
Draw

Kremlin Cup
Kremlin Cup